Lighthorne is a village and civil parish in Warwickshire, England. The population taken at the 2011 census was 361. Lighthorne is a small village in a valley and is near Moreton Morrell, Kineton and Wellesbourne. The first mention of a post office in the village is in October 1849, when a type of postmark known as an undated circle was issued. The parish church of St. Lawrence stands in a valley west of the village. It is built of stone in the late-13th century style but the west tower was rebuilt in 1771 and the remainder of the church in 1875–6. In October 2008, Lighthorne Parish council bought the telephone box in the village (which had been used only twice in three years) from the BT Group.

References

External links

Villages in Warwickshire